Ongala Podanum Sir is a 2019 Indian Tamil-language comedy horror film directed by R. L. Ravi and Sreejith Vijayan. It stars Jithan Ramesh in the lead role alongside five debutant actresses. Featuring music composed by Rejimon, the film began production in mid-2018 was released on 13 September 2019.

Cast 

Jithan Ramesh as David 
Sanuja Somanadh
Jonita Doda as Neha
Parijitha Singa
Vaishaly
Anu Nair
Manobala as Chairman Kasthuriman
Kalloori Vinoth as Shiv
Raja Rani Pandiyan
Mippu
Gajeesh Nageesh
Balaji
Poraali Dileepan

Production 
The adult comedy film began production in late 2018, and was completed by January 2019. Directors Ravi and Sreejith opted to name the film after a popular dialogue by Nayanthara's character in Naanum Rowdy Dhaan (2015). The makers cast five new actresses in the film alongside Jithan Ramesh, who was making a comeback after a brief sabbatical.

Soundtrack 
The film's soundtrack was composed by Reji Mon and Lyrics penned by Murugan Manthiram.
"Vennira Irave" – Naresh Iyer, Reji Mon
"Kela Kela Kelappu" – Anthony Daasan, Arya, Archana, Vishnuvardhan

Release 
The film had a low profile opening across Tamil Nadu on 13 September 2019. In its review, The Indian Express gave a negative impression and wrote the film was "a god-awful vulgarfest".

References

External links 

2019 films
2010s Tamil-language films
2019 comedy films
2010s sex comedy films
Indian sex comedy films